Voskresenovka is a rural locality (a selo) and the administrative center of Voskresenovsky Selsoviet, Limansky District, Astrakhan Oblast, Russia. The population was 257 as of 2010. There are 2 streets.

Geography 
Voskresenovka is located 44 km southeast of Liman (the district's administrative centre) by road. Burannoye is the nearest rural locality.

References 

Rural localities in Limansky District